Nail Beširović (born 22 July 1967) is a Bosnian retired footballer who played as a midfielder.

He spent the better part of his 16-year professional career in Portugal, representing six clubs.

Club career
Born in Sarajevo, SR Bosnia and Herzegovina, Socialist Federal Republic of Yugoslavia, Beširović began his career with FK Sloboda Tuzla. In January 1992 he moved to Portugal, where he remained until the end of his playing days twelve years later.

In that country Beširović represented S.C. Espinho and S.C. Farense in the Primeira Liga, and C.F. Estrela da Amadora, Académico de Viseu FC, Académica de Coimbra and Espinho in the second division, amassing totals in the former competition of 134 games and seven goals over the course of five seasons. He retired at the age of nearly 37 after a spell with amateurs Grupo Desportivo Beira-Mar, in Monte Gordo (Vila Real do Santo António).

International career
Beširović made one appearance for the Bosnia and Herzegovina national team, a June 1998 friendly match away against Macedonia in which he came on as a late substitute for Senad Repuh.

Personal life
Beširević's son Dino Beširević was born in Viseu, Portugal and is also a professional footballer.

References

External links

1967 births
Living people
Footballers from Sarajevo
Association football midfielders
Yugoslav footballers
Bosnia and Herzegovina footballers
Bosnia and Herzegovina international footballers
FK Sloboda Tuzla players
C.F. Estrela da Amadora players
Académico de Viseu F.C. players
Associação Académica de Coimbra – O.A.F. players
S.C. Espinho players
S.C. Farense players
Leixões S.C. players
GD Beira-Mar players
Yugoslav First League players
Primeira Liga players
Liga Portugal 2 players
Segunda Divisão players
Yugoslav expatriate footballers
Bosnia and Herzegovina expatriate footballers
Expatriate footballers in Portugal
Bosnia and Herzegovina expatriate sportspeople in Portugal